Holy Cross Church - a Roman Catholic parish church in Brzeg, in the Opole Voivodeship. The church belongs to the deanery of the North of Brzeg; Roman Catholic Archdiocese of Wrocław.

History and architecture

The church was built between 1734 and 1739 (the towers were built in between 1854 and 1856) in the location of the destroyed in 1545 monastery of the Dominicans - for the need of Jesuits which arrived to the town in 1677 (architect J. Frisch). The church has a single-aisle, with a number of side chapels and the tribunes. The ceiling stands out due to J.Kubena frescoes (1739-1745) presenting the glory of the Holy Cross, the missions of the Jesuit Order and figures of saints.

Gallery

See also
Brzeg Castle
St. Jadwiga's Church, Brzeg
St. Nicholas' Church, Brzeg

References

Brzeg County
Brzeg